The Chhattisgarh Police is the law enforcement agency for the state of Chhattisgarh in India. The agency is administered by the Department of Home Affairs of the Government of Chhattisgarh. The force has specialized units to fight the Naxalite–Maoist insurgency in some districts of the state.

Units
Special Task Force was raised in the year 2007 for battling Maoist insurgents in Chhattisgarh. Headquartered in Baghera of Durg district, the force has hubs coming up in the districts of Kanker, Sukma, Bijapur and Bastar.

District Reserve Guard was formed by recruiting local tribal boys to counter the Naxals.
Danteshwari Ladake, women commando unit of District Reserve Guard.

Training
The police officers are trained at the State Police Academy at Chandkhuri near Raipur.

Weaponry
INSAS rifles.
JVPC carbines.

References

Government of Chhattisgarh
State law enforcement agencies of India
2000 establishments in Chhattisgarh
Government agencies established in 2000